A number of armed groups had involved themselves in the Libyan Civil War.

Second Libyan Civil War (2014–2020)

Notes
The Tripoli brigade and Tajoura battalion are in fact currently fighting against haftar in Tripoli (April 2019)

The Shura Council of Benghazi Revolutionaries are fighting on the part of the GNA at the Gulf of Sidra Offensive (2017).
Parts of the Gaddafi loyalists are allied with the Libyan National Army.
The Libya Shield 1 is a part of the Libya Shield Force.

See also
List of armed groups in the Syrian Civil War
List of armed groups in the Iraqi Civil War
List of armed groups in the Yemeni Civil War
List of armed groups in the Syrian Civil War spillover in Lebanon
Combatants of the Iraq War

References

Aftermath of the First Libyan Civil War
Libya-related lists
Second Libyan Civil War
Military history of Libya
Lists of armed groups